Måløy–Skarholmen Lighthouse is a coastal lighthouse in Steigen Municipality in Nordland county, Norway.  The lighthouse marks the entrance to the upper Vestfjorden, the broad sound between the mainland and the Lofoten Islands.  It is located on the tiny islet of Måløyvær, about  straight west of the village of Leinesfjorden.  It was first established in 1922 and was automated in 1979. It was listed as a protected site in 1999.

The light burns year-round except between 2 May and 4 August each year when it is unnecessary due to the midnight sun. The light is white, red, or green depending on direction, occulting twice every 8 seconds. The tower is painted red with one white horizontal band and the keeper's house is painted white. The house has dwelling units for three keepers and was in use until the lighthouse was automated in 1979.

See also

Lighthouses in Norway
List of lighthouses in Norway

References

External links
 Norsk Fyrhistorisk Forening 

Lighthouses completed in 1922
Steigen
Lighthouses in Nordland
Listed lighthouses in Norway